Orden Satany (The Order of Satan) is the debut album by Korrozia Metalla. Originally released in 1988 as a self-published cassette, produced by Stas Namin. After that the album was professionally re-recorded with the assistance of Stas Namin and reissued in late 1991.

History 
Korrozia Metalla formed in 1984. The following year, they released a six-song cassingle titled "Vlast zla", which included a song called "Lucifer" as its lead-off track. "Lucifer" became a fixture in the group's setlists and would eventually be re-recorded for Orden Satany.

The original version of the album was recorded at a recording studio in Ostankino in the summer of 1988 over three nights. Melodiya, the Soviet state label, wouldn't release the album due to the Satanic themes in the lyrics, so bandleader Sergei Troitsky decided to release it on his own, selling it on cassette at concerts. These tapes would also be traded among fans.

In 1991, the group signed a record deal with SNC Records, who offered to release Orden Satany, however the master tapes were lost, so between July and September, they re-recorded the album at Stas Namin's studio. The band, however, still list 1988 as the release date for the album in all their discographies, even though it was given its first official release in 1991. On the 1991 version of the album, the track "Motorocker", recorded both in Russian and English, was included in its English form, "Wheels of Fire".

In 1994, Korrozia Metalla signed to Moroz Records, who reissued the album on CD the following year. "Motorocker" was included in its Russian version and an instrumental, "Sedmye vorota ada", recorded in November 1994 with a keyboard-based industrial trio called Block Four (which also made Nicht Kapituliren), was included at the end of the album.

In 2008, the album was remastered and reissued by the band's label KTR. Bonus tracks included an instrumental, "Marsh Drakuly" (an outtake from the 1991 sessions), the original version of "Lucifer" from the 1988 release as recorded at Ostankino, and four live videos.

In 2021, the original 1988 recordings were remastered and released on CD for the first time, with a bonus disc containing the Live in October live album.

Track listing

Personnel 
 Sergei Vysokosov - vocals, lead guitar
 Roman Lebedev - rhythm guitar
 Sergei Troitsky - bass
 Alexander Bondarenko - drums
 Konstantin Smirnov, Yuri Orlov, Oleg Salkhov - keyboards, mixed by (The Seventh Gates of Hell)

External links 
 Orden Satany at Discogs (list of versions)

1988 debut albums
Korrozia Metalla albums